Boris Protik was a Mayor of Kumanovo Municipality in Macedonia.

See also
Mayor of Kumanovo 
List of Mayors of Kumanovo 
Kumanovo Municipality 
Kumanovo shootings 
Timeline of Kumanovo

References

 

Mayors of Kumanovo
1953 births
2002 deaths